Clauzadeana is a genus of lichen-forming fungi in the  family Lecanoraceae. The genus was circumscribed in 1984 by Claude Roux,  with the crustose species C. instratula assigned as the type.

The genus name Clauzadeana honours F.J. Georges Clauzade (1914–2002), a French teacher and botanist (Mycology and Lichenology).

References

Lecanoraceae
Lecanorales genera
Lichen genera
Taxa described in 1984
Taxa named by Claude Roux